Adaptationism (also known as functionalism) is the Darwinian view that many physical and psychological traits of organisms are evolved adaptations. Pan-adaptationism is the strong form of this, deriving from the early 20th century modern synthesis, that all traits are adaptations, a view now shared by only a few biologists.

The "adaptationist program" was heavily criticized by Stephen Jay Gould and Richard Lewontin in their 1979 paper "The Spandrels of San Marco and the Panglossian Paradigm". According to Gould and Lewontin, evolutionary biologists had a habit of proposing adaptive explanations for any trait by default without considering non-adaptive alternatives, and often by conflating products of adaptation with the process of natural selection. One formal alternative to adaptationist explanations for traits in organisms is the neutral theory of molecular evolution, which proposes that features in organisms can arise through neutral transitions and become fixed in a population by chance (genetic drift). Constructive neutral evolution (CNE) is another paradigm which proposes a means by which complex systems emerge through neutral transitions, and CNE has been used to help understand the origins of a wide variety of features from the spliceosome of eukaryotes to the interdependency and simplification widespread in microbial communities. For many, neutral evolution is seen as the null hypothesis when attempting to explain the origins of a complex trait, so that adaptive scenarios for the origins of traits undergo a more rigorous demonstration prior to their acceptance.

Introduction

Criteria to identify a trait as an adaptation

Adaptationism is an approach to studying the evolution of form and function. It attempts to frame the existence and persistence of traits, assuming that each of them arose independently and improved the reproductive success of the organism's ancestors. 
A trait is an adaptation if it fulfils the following criteria:

 The trait is a variation of an earlier form.
 The trait is heritable through the transmission of genes.
 The trait enhances reproductive success.

Constraints on the power of evolution

Genetic constraints
Genetic reality provides constraints on the power of random mutation followed by natural selection.

With pleiotropy, some genes control multiple traits, so that adaptation of one trait is impeded by effects on other traits that are not necessarily adaptive. Selection that influences epistasis is a case where the regulation or expression of one gene, depends on one or several others. This is true for a good number of genes though to differing extents. The reason why this leads to muddied responses is that selection for a trait that is epistatically based can mean that an allele for a gene that is epistatic when selected would happen to affect others. This leads to the coregulation of others for a reason other than there is an adaptive quality to each of those traits. Like with pleiotropy, traits could reach fixation in a population as a by-product of selection for another.

In the context of development the difference between pleiotropy and epistasis is not so clear but at the genetic level the distinction is more clear. With these traits as being by-products of others it can ultimately be said that these traits evolved but not that they necessarily represent adaptations.

Polygenic traits are controlled by a number of separate genes. Many traits are polygenic, for example human height. To drastically change a polygenic trait is likely to require multiple changes.

Anatomical constraints

Anatomical constraints are features of organism's anatomy that are prevented from change by being constrained in some way. When organisms diverge from a common ancestor and inherit certain characteristics which become modified by natural selection of mutant phenotypes, it is as if some traits are locked in place and are unable to change in certain ways. Some textbook anatomical constraints often include examples of structures that connect parts of the body together though a physical link.

These links are hard if not impossible to break because evolution usually requires that anatomy be formed by small consecutive modifications in populations through generations. In his book, Why We Get Sick, Randolph Nesse uses the "blind spot" in the vertebrate eye (caused by the nerve fibers running through the retina) as an example of this. He argues that natural selection has come up with an elaborate work-around of the eyes wobbling back-and-forth to correct for this, but vertebrates have not found the solution embodied in cephalopod eyes, where the optic nerve does not interrupt the view. See also: Evolution of the eye.

Another example is the cranial nerves in tetrapods. In early vertebrate evolution, sharks, skates, and rays (collectively Chondrichthyes), the cranial nerves run from the part of the brain that interprets sensory information, and radiate out towards the organs that produce those sensations. In tetrapods, however, and mammals in particular, the nerves take an elaborate winding path through the cranium around structures that evolved after the common ancestor with sharks.

Debate with structuralism

Adaptationism is sometimes characterized by critics as an unsubstantiated assumption that all or most traits are optimal adaptations. Structuralist critics (most notably Richard Lewontin and Stephen Jay Gould in their "spandrel" paper) contend that the adaptationists have overemphasized the power of natural selection to shape individual traits to an evolutionary optimum. Adaptationists are sometimes accused by their critics of using ad hoc "just-so stories". The critics, in turn, have been accused of misrepresentation (Straw man argumentation), rather than attacking the actual statements of supposed adaptationists.

Adaptationist researchers respond by asserting that they, too, follow George Williams' depiction of adaptation as an "onerous concept" that should only be applied in light of strong evidence. This evidence can be generally characterized as the successful prediction of novel phenomena based on the hypothesis that design details of adaptations should fit a complex evolved design to respond to a specific set of selection pressures. In evolutionary psychology, researchers such as Leda Cosmides, John Tooby, and David Buss contend that the bulk of research findings that were uniquely predicted through adaptationist hypothesizing comprise evidence of the methods' validity.

Purpose and function

There are philosophical issues with the way biologists speak of function, effectively invoking teleology, the purpose of an adaptation.

Function

To say something has a function is to say something about what it does for the organism. It also says something about its history: how it has come about. A heart pumps blood: that is its function. It also emits sound, which is considered to be an ancillary side-effect, not its function. The heart has a history (which may be well or poorly understood), and that history is about how natural selection formed and maintained the heart as a pump. Every aspect of an organism that has a function has a history. Now, an adaptation must have a functional history: therefore we expect it must have undergone selection caused by relative survival in its habitat. It would be quite wrong to use the word adaptation about a trait which arose as a by-product.

Teleology 

Teleology was introduced into biology by Aristotle to describe the adaptedness of organisms. Biologists have found the implications of purposefulness awkward as they suggest supernatural intention, an aspect of Plato's thinking which Aristotle rejected.  A similar term, teleonomy, grew out of cybernetics and self-organising systems and was used by biologists of the 1960s such as Ernst Mayr and George C. Williams as a less loaded alternative. On the one hand, adaptation is obviously purposeful: natural selection chooses what works and eliminates what does not. On the other hand, biologists want to deny conscious purpose in evolution. The dilemma gave rise to a famous joke by the evolutionary biologist Haldane: "Teleology is like a mistress to a biologist: he cannot live without her but he's unwilling to be seen with her in public.'" David Hull commented that Haldane's mistress "has become a lawfully wedded wife. Biologists no longer feel obligated to apologize for their use of teleological language; they flaunt it. The only concession which they make to its disreputable past is to rename it 'teleonomy'."

See also

 Adaptive evolution in the human genome
 Beneficial acclimation hypothesis
Constructive neutral evolution
 Evolutionary failure
 Exaptation
 Gene-centered view of evolution
Neutral theory of molecular evolution
 Vitalism

References

Sources

External links
Information from "Deep Ethology" course website, by Neil Greenberg
Tooby & Cosmides comments on Maynard Smith's New York Review of Books piece on Gould et al.

Evolutionary biology
Modern synthesis (20th century)